Street Without a King, is a French comedy film from 1950, directed by Marcel Gibaud, based on the cartoons by Albert Dubout, and starring André Gabriello as gangster Sparadra and featuring Louis de Funès as a music teacher.

Cast 
 Andrée Gabriello: Sparadra
 Paul Demange: Anatole
 Max Dalban: Fifille (Anatole's wife)
 Nathalie Nattier: Emma (the vamp)
 Annette Poivre: countess of the Trill
 Albert Dinan: François (Anatole's colleague)
 Louis de Funès (as De Funès): Hippolyte (the music teacher)
 Jackie Sardou: The nanny (uncredited)

References

External links 
 
 La Rue sans loi (1950) at the Films de France

1950 films
French comedy films
1950s French-language films
French black-and-white films
Films based on French comics
Live-action films based on comics
Films scored by Marcel Landowski
1950 comedy films
1950s French films